Delaware's 5th Senate district is one of 21 districts in the Delaware Senate. It has been represented by Democrat Kyle Evans Gay since 2020, following her defeat of incumbent Republican Catherine Cloutier.

Geography
District 5 covers the northern suburbs of Wilmington in New Castle County  including Arden, Ardencroft, Ardentown, Windsor Hills, Naamans Manor, Wilmont, Talleys Corner, Afton, Shellburne, Windybush, Heatherbrooke, Chalfonte, and other unincorporated areas.

Like all districts in the state, the 5th Senate district is located entirely within Delaware's at-large congressional district. It overlaps with the 6th, 7th, 10th, and 12th districts of the Delaware House of Representatives. The district also borders Pennsylvania along the Twelve-Mile Circle.

Recent election results
Delaware Senators are elected to staggered four-year terms. Under normal circumstances, the 5th district holds elections in presidential years, except immediately after redistricting, when all seats are up for election regardless of usual cycle.

2020

2016

2012

Federal and statewide results in District 5

References 

5
New Castle County, Delaware